The Lower Volta Bridge, also known as Sogakope Bridge, is a 650 meter long bridge on the N1 highway (Aflao — Accra) that connects Sogakope to Sokpoe over the Volta River.

History 

The bridge was constructed between January 1965 and January 1967 by two German contractors.

In 2009 the bridge was described as a death trap due to damages. There was also an appeal in 2013 by the residents of Sogakope to Ghana Highways Authority to repair the rusting expansion and contraction joints.

Ghana Government is planning to build a new cable-stayed bridge (New Volta Bridge) to be started in 2021.

References 

Bridges completed in 1967
Bridges in Ghana
Volta Region